William D'Elia is an American screenwriter, producer, director and actor.

Life
D'Elia grew up in Queens, New York City, and is a second generation Italian-American. He graduated from Ithaca College, and earned a master's degree in communication arts from William Paterson University in 1972.

D'Elia has two sons with his wife, Ellie Dombroski: actor and comedian Chris D'Elia, and filmmaker Matt D'Elia.

Career
In the 1980s, D'Elia was a director of television commercials. In 1989, he independently produced and directed the film The Feud, based on the 1983 novel by Thomas Berger. The film attracted the attention of Steven Bochco, who hired D'Elia to direct an episode of Doogie Howser, M.D..  D'Elia went on to direct episodes of numerous other television series including Northern Exposure, Glee, Chicago Hope, Ally McBeal, The Practice, Boston Legal, and The West Wing. D'Elia was an executive producer and a director of Chicago Hope, Boston Legal, Ally McBeal, Harry's Law, Monday Mornings, The Crazy Ones (all collaborations with David E. Kelley), and the Shonda Rhimes series How To Get Away With Murder. He also co-created the series Judging Amy. He is currently an executive producer and a director for the Disney+ series Big Shot starring John Stamos.

Awards
D'Elia has been nominated for a total of eight Emmy Awards – four as director and four as executive producer: Chicago Hope (two for producing, one for directing); one for directing Ally McBeal; and two each for producing and directing Boston Legal.

Filmography

Film

Television

As actor

Film

Television

References

External links 

Year of birth missing (living people)
Living people
American television directors
American television writers
American male television writers
People from Queens, New York
Television producers from New York City
Ithaca College alumni
William Paterson University alumni
American writers of Italian descent
Screenwriters from New York (state)